"The Tyrant" is the fourth episode of the sixth season of House. It first aired October 5, 2009.

Plot
The team treats a brutal African dictator named Dibala (James Earl Jones) who has fallen ill. The dictator had made threats of ethnic cleansing against an ethnic minority, the Sitibi, and the team deals with ethical issues of treating a potential mass murderer.

The episode features a refugee who attempts to persuade Chase to let Dibala die from his illness. Later he dresses as a nurse and tries to enter Dibala's room with a pistol. This assassination attempt is violently thwarted by Dibala's guards. Chase finds out that this man was one of Dibala's child soldiers, ordered to torture and murder an innocent woman, and the man tells Chase that Dibala will do this to all the Sitibi. Chase is more curious than others and confronts Dibala, who eventually reveals his plans to kill off the ethnic minority as Sitibi rebels massacred tens of thousands in the south of his country twenty years prior and he fears a genocide from them. Dibala also mentions his youngest son is studying in Princeton and hasn't spoken to him in years because of what he reads in the papers about his father, though he admits he made a mistake that lead to his youth labor league experiencing abuses and promises to prevent such an event in the future.

Since Taub has resigned and Thirteen was fired, Cuddy gets Chase and Cameron to help Foreman in his diagnosis. They first consider dioxin poisoning from an assassination attempt and start Dibala on olestra. Afterwards, Dibala has a heart attack and runs a fever. House suggests Lassa fever, and Dibala is started on ribavirin. Dibala brings in a lady called Ama, claiming his Health Minister advised that blood plasma from one with antibodies for Lassa fever is more effective than ribavirin, and wants the team to use her blood. She insists they let her do this. Cameron suspects she is being threatened, and Cuddy says that if she is, she'd rather "have a prick on her conscience" than the death of Ama's family members, so Cuddy tells the team to use Ama's blood.

Dibala's right eye becomes bloody, a result of an enlarged lymph node which blocked the retinal vein. Foreman suggests lymphoma. They do a lymph node biopsy, which comes back negative. Dibala also develops lack of short-term memory, spikes a fever and has nodules in his fingers. House thinks it's scleroderma, Cameron doesn't give an opinion, and Chase and Foreman think it's blastomycosis, so they start him on amphotericin B. Dibala's colonel, Ntiba, asks Cameron if Dibala is capable of thinking clearly. She replies that he definitely is not in his right mind at the moment. She adds that neurons don't regenerate and Dibala is already in his decline. She questions the colonel as to whether he can ever be sure if the commands Dibala gives from now on aren't just delusions of a sick, mad, dying old man.

While giving Dibala a dose of amphotericin B, a minuscule but visible-enough air bubble appears, whereupon Dibala violently grabs her wrist and suspects her of attempting to kill him  with another heart attack by injecting the bubble into his bloodstream. He confronts her about what she told Colonel Ntiba, and says she was putting a gun in Ntiba's hand. Now, he states, the gun is in her hand by only a practical difference, and he tells her she should kill him if she wants him dead, but notes that it's not so easy to kill on one's own. After a moment, Cameron puts the dose back in the bottle. Chase swears to kick Dibala out onto the street if he touches Cameron like that again. Dibala claims he showed Cameron her true character, saying she's too weak to act on her beliefs. Chase confronts him about what his planned genocide of the Sitibi truly is to him. Dibala answers with: 'Whatever it takes to protect my country!' After this, Cameron decides to take a side, and asks Chase for a blood test to confirm scleroderma.

The blood test hints towards scleroderma, so Foreman switches Dibala to steroids. Dibala eventually dies from severe bleeding into his lungs. Foreman finds a piece of paper that shows Chase had signed into the morgue right before he performed the blood test on Dibala. He realizes Chase faked the results of the test using another patient's blood, to cause the team to treat incorrectly and kill the dictator and confronts him about this. Chase says there is now a chance for peace and tells Foreman that if the police are to come for him, to warn him so he can first explain to Cameron.

The subplot involves Wilson and House trying to make amends with a difficult neighbor, whose complaints range from noise pollution to the smell of Wilson's cooking. House is staying with Wilson and his curiosity and meddling leads him to confront the neighbor and look into his apartment. He finds that the neighbor is a wounded veteran who lost an arm in Vietnam. However, House's further investigations lead him to discover the neighbor is Canadian, and suspects him of being a military impostor. Their neighbor's anger is derived from his pain, and his pain is due to a psychosomatic attachment to a phantom limb. House confronts him about his veteran status, claiming that Canada was not a belligerent in the Vietnam War. Wilson's neighbor retorts that historically Canada did send troops to Vietnam in 1973 to enforce the peace process where he struck a land mine saving a child. House solves the dispute with Wilson's neighbor by kidnapping him and forcing him to undergo V.S. Ramachandran's Mirror box therapy, curing his phantom pains in his amputated hand. The neighbor is extremely happy and thanks House. Wilson finds the neighbor has withdrawn all accusations and is no longer interfering in his matters. Wilson wonders what House did, and House says he was nice. Wilson doesn't really believe him, but House merely asks, 'Do you really want to know?' Wilson says he'll give House the benefit of the doubt.

Meanwhile, Thirteen breaks up with Foreman, saying he wanted to do it to her but didn't have the guts and therefore fired her instead. He insists this isn't true and asks her to dinner. She initially refuses, but later accepts when she finds that Foreman got her a job at Princeton-General. She asks him why he didn't simply step down instead of firing her, and asks him if he would do that instead if he could turn back time. Foreman insists he made the right choice, so Thirteen leaves.

The episode ends with House and Wilson watching TV in peace. Dibala's son arrives from Princeton and is shown crying over the dictator's dead body. Chase goes home and lies down in bed next to Cameron, very clearly feeling guilt about his actions. Foreman is seen in his office, burning the records that showed that Chase had accessed the morgue without a valid reason and faked the blood test.

References

External links 

 "The Tyrant" at Fox.com
 

House (season 6) episodes
2009 American television episodes
Television episodes directed by David Straiton

fr:Le Serment d'Hippocrate
it:Episodi di Dr. House - Medical Division (sesta stagione)#Il tiranno